"The Belle of St. Mark" is a song recorded by singer/percussionist Sheila E. The song was released in November 1984 in the United States and in the Netherlands, and in February 1985 in other markets. It peaked at No. 34 on the Billboard Hot 100 in December 1984, and No. 68 on the Hot R&B/Hip Hop Singles Charts in January 1985. It reached the top 10 in the Netherlands and New Zealand as well as the top 20 in Australia, the UK and Ireland, and was an NME "Single of the Week".

Background
The song's lyrics tell of an androgynous "frail but passionate creature", referred to as "he" throughout, but called the feminine "Belle". (Androgyny was a prevalent theme in the music of Sheila E.'s mentor, Prince, and common in pop music of the period.) The song implies the Belle is French (viz. the lyrics, "His Paris hair, it blows in the warm Parisian air / That blows whenever his Paris hair is there") but St. Mark is commonly known as a location in Venice, Italy, although it is referencing the St. Mark's Episcopal Cathedral (Minneapolis) which the writer of the song at the time (Prince) lived near the church and grew fond of their bells, and the same bells are featured in the beginning of the song.

Track listing

7" vinyl
Side one
"The Belle of St. Mark" – 3:38
Side two
"Too Sexy" – 5:03

12" vinyl
Side one
"The Belle of St. Mark" (dance remix) – 7:43
Side two
"Too Sexy" – 5:05

Chart performance

Weekly charts

Year-end charts

References

1984 singles
1985 singles
Sheila E. songs
Songs written by Prince (musician)
Song recordings produced by Prince (musician)
1984 songs
Warner Records singles